USS Boxwood (YN-3/AN-8) was an Aloe-class net laying ship which was assigned to serve U.S. Navy ships and harbors during World War II with her protective anti-submarine nets.

Career 
Boxwood (YN-3)—originally named Birch but renamed before her construction began—was laid down on 19 November 1940 at Houghton, Washington, by the Lake Washington Shipyard; launched on 8 March 1941; and placed in service on 25 July 1941 at the Puget Sound Navy Yard, Bremerton, Washington. Assigned to duty with the Inshore Patrol, 13th Naval District, the net tender reported to the section headquarters at Seattle, Washington, on 6 August and commenced operating between that port, Port Townsend, and Port Angeles, performing various towing tasks within the district. One typical chore was her towing of targets for the gunboat  during September and October 1941.

The Japanese attack on Pearl Harbor on 7 December 1941 prompted a flurry of defensive activity along the U.S. West Coast. Over the ensuing weeks, Boxwood remained on station in the Rich Pass area, maintaining the net line and occasionally conducting local patrol work.

On 16 February, Boxwood sailed for Indian Island, Washington, and was soon busily engaged in work at the Net Depot there, installing an antisubmarine net line at Port Townsend, a combination antisubmarine and anti-torpedo net line at Marrowstone Spit, and a fine mesh net line across the Portage Canal. She completed the installation of approximately a mile and a half of netting on 11 July and remained in the Puget Sound area tending nets for the remainder of 1942. Placed in full commission on 2 January 1943, Boxwood resumed her tending tasks after her overhaul at Todd, Seattle, shipyard and carried them out through the spring of 1943.

Alaskan duty 
Departing the Seattle area on 26 June 1943, Boxwood relieved  at Adak, in the Aleutians, and assisted in the installation of antitorpedo net lines at Adak and Sand Bay, and helped in laying fleet mooring buoys. After tending nets in the Adak area during the invasion of Kiska, Boxwood proceeded to Kiska as a replacement for a destroyer operating off that island and thus gained the distinction of being the first net tender in that area. Soon after Boxwood's arrival, Buckeye joined her; and the two ships installed cruiser moorings in Kiska harbor, as well as approximately two miles of a combination anti-torpedo and submarine-indicator net.

Resuming her duties at Adak in October 1943, Boxwood later received minor damage while assisting the grounded destroyer  in Kulak Bay. During her operations in these northern climes, Boxwood was redesignated AN-8 on 20 January 1944.

Ordered to Kiska on 15 February 1944, Boxwood proceeded thence and repaired some of the cruiser moorings that she had laid there earlier. Upon completion of repairs and alterations at Adak on 31 October, Boxwood resumed tending the net defenses there early in November 1944. Subsequently ordered to Attu on 10 January 1945, Boxwood arrived on station two days later and relieved Buckthorn. Relieved by that ship on 22 June 1945 to return to Adak for overhaul, Boxwood was still undergoing repairs and alterations when Japan capitulated in mid-August 1945. Upon completion of the overhaul on 20 August 1945, Boxwood resumed her net tending tasks, only to receive orders to begin removing the net defenses at Adak on the 21st.

Boxwood sailed for Kodiak, Alaska, on 6 October and served there until 28 November when she was ordered to Dutch Harbor. Attached to the naval operating base there, Boxwood performed utility jobs such as transporting mail and stores to nearby island bases and decommissioned the radio station at Caton Island, Alaska. During 1946, Boxwood made several trips carrying passengers and mail between various bases in the Alaskan Sea Frontier and the naval station at Seattle, Washington, through mid-August 1946 when she entered the Puget Sound Naval Shipyard.

In the fall of 1946, Boxwood underwent a preinactivation overhaul at the Kaiser Shipyard, Vancouver, Washington. She was decommissioned on 13 November 1946 and was turned over to the Portland, Oregon, Sub-group of the 19th Fleet and moored at Swan Island, Portland, Oregon. She remained inactive until her name was struck from the Navy List on 9 October 1962. Shifted to the National Defense Reserve Fleet at Suisun Bay, California, the ship was carried on vessel inventory reports through the end of 1974. Subsequent fate not known.

References 
 
 NavSource Online: Service Ship Photo Archive - YN-3 Birch / Boxwood - AN-8 Boxwood

 

Aloe-class net laying ships
1941 ships
World War II net laying ships of the United States
Ships built at Lake Washington Shipyard